Silent Night, Lonely Night is a 1959 play by Robert Anderson.

The 1959 production on Broadway starred Henry Fonda and Barbara Bel Geddes.

It was Anderson's last play for a number of years.

1969 TV adaptation
The play was adapted into a television film in 1969, produced by Universal Television and broadcast on NBC. The film was directed by Daniel Petrie and starred Lloyd Bridges and Shirley Jones. Jones received an Emmy award nomination for her performance. The film score was composed by Billy Goldenberg.

References

External links
Review of 1959 Broadway production at the Crimson
1959 Broadway production at IBDB
1969 TV Adaptation at IMDb

1959 plays
Adultery in plays
American plays adapted into films
Broadway plays
Christmas plays
Plays by Robert Woodruff Anderson
Works set in hotels
1969 films
1969 television films
1960s Christmas drama films
1960s Christmas films
Adultery in films
American Christmas drama films
American films based on plays
Christmas television films
Films directed by Daniel Petrie
Films scored by Billy Goldenberg
Films set in hotels
Films set in New England
Films shot in Massachusetts
NBC network original films
1960s English-language films
1960s American films